The Protestant Protective Association was an anti-Catholic group in the 1890s based in Ontario, Canada, associated with the Orange Order. Originally a spinoff of the American group the American Protective Association, it became independent in 1892. The PPA denounced the role of Catholics and French-Canadians in politics, and warned Protestants that Catholics were attempting to take over Ontario. It aimed to eliminate French language education in schools in Ontario and western Canada (particularly Manitoba), and to roll back or block Catholic school systems in those provinces.

The PPA ran several candidates in Ontario for the 1896 federal election as a protest against the Conservative Party's conflicted position on the Manitoba Schools Question. The PPA failed to win any seats in the House of Commons of Canada, but was instrumental in defeating Conservative candidates in four of the five ridings in which it nominated candidates.

In the 1894 provincial election the party succeeded in winning several seats in the Legislative Assembly of Ontario. These members worked closely with the opposition Ontario Conservative Party.

References
 James Watt, "Anti-Catholic Nativism in Canada: The Protestant Protective Association," Canadian Historical Review 48 (1967): 45-58
 James T. Watt, "Anti-Catholicism in Ontario Politics: The Role of the Protestant Protective Association in the 1894 Election," Ontario History, Nov 1967, Vol. 59 Issue 2, pp 57–67

See also
 American Protective Association
 Anti-Catholicism
 List of Ontario general elections
 List of political parties in Canada

Anti-Catholic organizations
Anti-Quebec sentiment
Canadian far-right political movements
Francophobia in North America
Political parties established in 1894
Federal political parties in Canada
Defunct provincial political parties in Ontario
Orange Order
Protestant political parties
Defunct Christian political parties
Defunct political parties in Canada
 
Anti-Catholicism